The Belfast and County Down Railway (BCDR) was an Irish gauge railway in Ireland (later Northern Ireland) linking Belfast with County Down. It was built in the 19th century and absorbed into the Ulster Transport Authority in 1948. All but the line between Belfast and Bangor was closed in the 1950s, although some of it has been restored near Downpatrick by a heritage line, the Downpatrick and County Down Railway.

History
The company was incorporated on 26 June 1846 with the first section of line from Belfast to Holywood opening for traffic on 2 August 1848. The line was further extended to Bangor by the Belfast, Holywood and Bangor Railway (BHBR), opening on 1 May 1865, and acquired by the BCDR in 1884. The line to Downpatrick was opened on 25 March 1859. The line from Downpatrick to Newcastle was built by the Downpatrick, Dundrum and Newcastle Railway, opening on 25 March 1869 and absorbed by BCDR on 14 July 1884. The railway's first chief engineer was Sir John Macneill, who was responsible for allowing the railway to cross the marshy River Quoile. 

A branch to Ballynahinch was opened in 1858 via Ballynahinch Junction.

A branch line from Downpatrick to Ardglass was opened in 1892, as was a loop line at Downpatrick. This resulted in a 'triangle'-shaped track layout just outside of Downpatrick, allowing trains between Belfast and Newcastle to collect and drop off passengers at the Loop Platform, who would be ferried between there and the main station at Downpatrick by a local train. Thanks to the triangular layout, trains were still capable of operating directly from the main Downpatrick station to Belfast or Newcastle. The branch from Newcastle to Castlewellan was opened on 24 March 1906.

By 1948 the company had 29 locomotives. Two steam railcars from Kitson & Co. were acquired in 1905. The locomotive works were at Belfast Queen's Quay railway station and closed in 1950. New carriage works had been opened in 1886, with the last carriage being built in 1923.

Routes

Belfast (Queen's Quay) – Ballymacarrett Halt – Victoria Park – Sydenham – Tillysburn – Holywood – Marino – Cultra Halt – Craigavad – Helen's Bay – Carnalea – Bangor West Halt – Bangor
Belfast (Queen's Quay) – Bloomfield –  – Knock – Dundonald – Comber
Comber – Ballygowan – Shepherd's Bridge Halt – Saintfield – Ballynahinch Junction – Crossgar – King's Bridge Halt – Downpatrick
Comber – Ballygowan – Shepherd's Bridge Halt – Saintfield – Ballynahinch Junction – Creevyargon Halt – Ballynahinch
Comber – Newtownards – Conlig – Ballygrainey – Millisle Halt – Donaghadee
Downpatrick – Downpatrick Loop Platform – Tullymurry – Ballykinlar Halt – Dundrum – Newcastle – Castlewellan
Downpatrick – Downpatrick Loop Platform – Racecourse Platform – Ballynoe – Bright Halt – Killough – Coney Island Halt – Ardglass

Steamships
The BH&BR Act of 1881 authorised that company not only to have a railway built between Holywood and Bangor but also to run steamships "for the purpose of establishing an improved and efficient communication between Belfast, Holywood and Bangor". The BH&BR did not exercise this power, but several years after it had been taken over by the B&CDR the latter company started running scheduled passenger steamship services on the route.

The B&CDR took advice from the Glasgow and South Western Railway (G&SWR), which had been running passenger paddle steamers since 1891. For the 1893 season the G&SWR had ordered a new ship, to be built by J&G Thomson at Clydebank. Thomson's launched Slieve Donard on 20 May 1893 and she entered service between Belfast's Donegall Quay and Bangor on 20 June. She was named after Slieve Donard, the highest peak in the Mourne Mountains in County Down.

In October 1893 the B&CDR ordered a slightly larger paddle steamer, named after Slieve Bearnagh, the second-highest peak in the Mourne Mountains. She made her first voyage on Belfast Lough on 1 May 1894. Donard and Bearnagh worked between Donegall Quay and Bangor, between them providing six sailings per day from Mondays to Saturdays and five on Sundays. From Mondays to Saturdays one mid-afternoon sailing per day extended around the coast to Donaghadee. On Saturday afternoons other sailings continued from Bangor across Belfast Lough to Larne.

These ships were older and smaller than those that Thomson had supplied, and the B&CDR seems to have made little use of them. Bangor Castle had been on charter to the Southampton, Isle of Wight and South of England Royal Mail Steam Packet Company since 1888 and was scrapped in 1899.

In 1899 the railway sold Slieve Donard to Alexander Campbell, co-founder of the P&A Campbell pleasure steamer company. Slieve Bearnagh remained with the B&CDR, occasionally making excursions to Portaferry on the Ards Peninsula, Ardglass in south Down, and Larne and Portrush on the coast of County Antrim in addition to her regular scheduled route on Belfast Lough.

At the end of the 1911 summer season the B&CDR put Slieve Bearnagh up for sale and ordered a new paddle steamer, again slightly larger than her predecessors. A&J Inglis of Pointhouse, Glasgow launched the new ship, PS Erin's Isle, on 12 June 1912 and fitted her out in less than a month. On 19 June 1912 the railway sold Slieve Bearnagh to D&J Nicol of Dundee for service on the east coast of Scotland. Erin's Isle was in B&CDR service from 12 July 1912 until her fourth summer season ended on 29 September 1915. On 20 November 1915 the Admiralty requisitioned her for £400 per month to be a Royal Navy minesweeper. On 7 May 1919 she was sunk by a mine, for which the Admiralty paid £53,676 compensation. However, the railway found that a new ship would cost £64,000 and decided not to return to owning steamships.

Ulster Transport Authority
In 1946 the Northern Ireland Government announced that it would unite under a single authority all public transport that was wholly within Northern Ireland. The Transport Act (NI) 1948 created the Ulster Transport Authority which took over the BCDR on 1 October 1948 and the Northern Counties Committee on 1 April 1949.

On 15 January 1950 the UTA withdrew services on the former BCDR lines between Comber and Newcastle; Ballynahinch Junction and Ballynahinch; and Downpatrick and Ardglass. The Northern Ireland Transport Tribunal had authorised these closures on 15 December 1949.

The UTA withdrew services between Ballymacarrett Junction and Donaghadee on 22 April 1950. The line between Castlewellan and Newcastle remained open until 1 May 1955, served by Great Northern Railway Board trains to and from Banbridge. Once these two sections had been closed, the line between Belfast and Bangor was the only part of the former BCDR that remained open.

When the UTA took it over, the BCDR had 29 locomotives, 181 carriages and 25 other coaching vehicles, 629 wagons mostly covered vans and wagons but also including some 6-wheeled fish vans, and 54 service vehicles.

Incidents and accidents
In the Ballymacarrett rail crash of 1871, on 13 May, 2 died and 55 were injured when a passenger train ran into a derailed goods train at Ballymacarrett Junction. The goods train derailed when a drunken fireman drove the train into an unfinished turnout, fouling the line.

In the Ballymacarrett rail crash, on 10 January 1945, 22 passengers died and 27 were injured when a railmotor car ran into the rear of a conventional train stopped at a signal at Ballymacarrett Junction.  The 7.40 a.m. rail motor Holywood to Belfast crashed into the rear of the 7.10 a.m. Bangor to Belfast train. The darkness and local fog were a factor but the driver of the rail motor was held to blame. The Railway had to pay out some £80,000 in compensation, which crippled the company financially, leading to its early nationalisation in 1948.

Downpatrick & County Down Railway
The Downpatrick & County Down Railway (DCDR) operates the only Irish Gauge heritage railways in Northern Ireland on part of the former BCDR Belfast-Newcastle main line. It has fully restored and operates several miles of track, including the famous 'Downpatrick Loop', complete with original restored platform. The DCDR operates four railway stations on the line, one of which was the original BCDR Loop Platform. The railway holds a vast collection of BCDR rolling stock and museum artefacts, the majority of which are on display for the public to enjoy. The DCDR's logo is based on a monogram previously used by the BCDR.

Preservation 

Seven carriages that were once owned by the Belfast and County Down Railway have survived into preservation. Among them are three six-wheeled carriages built at Queen's Quay by the BCDR, one of the railway's three railmotors, an 1897 composite bogie coach, the BCDR's royal saloon No. 153, and a six-wheeled carriage built at Dundalk by the Great Northern Railway that was later purchased by the BCDR. All of these apart from six-wheeled third No. 18, built at Queen's Quay, are located at the Downpatrick and County Down Railway. So far, bogie coach No. 148 and ex-railmotor No. 72 have been fully restored, while No. 153 is part-way through overhaul. The other coaches owned by the railway are awaiting maintenance on site.

In addition, one BCDR locomotive has been preserved at the Ulster Folk and Transport Museum, Cultra: BCDR No. 30, which was built in 1901 by Beyer, Peacock and Co. The engine was renumbered 230 by the Ulster Transport Authority in 1951, and preserved by the company for static display. It is one of only 19 remaining 5' 3" gauge steam locomotives left in Ireland.

After closure
Much of the line between Belfast and Newcastle was lifted in the early- to mid-1950s by the Ulster Transport Authority, shortly after the closure of the line. Some of the trackbed was purchased by farmers, while some was later used for walkways: for example, the stretch of former line North of Dundrum. As already mentioned, some of the line was relaid by the DCDR.

The line from Belfast to Comber was converted in the 2000s to The Comber Greenway, a  walk and cycleway.

References

Sources and further reading

 *

External links
Downpatrick & County Down Railway

Dundonald Railway Station Then & Now
Belfast Queens Quay station signalbox

Closed railways in Northern Ireland
Transport in Belfast
Transport in County Down
Defunct railway companies of Ireland
Irish gauge railways